Oogon-Talaa is a village in Jalal-Abad Region of Kyrgyzstan. It is part of the Bazar-Korgon District. Its population was 3,274 in 2021. It lies on the river Kara-Üngkür.

References
 

Populated places in Jalal-Abad Region